Robert Charles ("Rob") Koons (born February 22, 1957) is an American philosopher. He is a professor of philosophy at the University of Texas (UT), noted for his contribution to metaphysics and philosophical logic. Koons has also advocated for academic freedom and courses on Western civilization.

Koons was born in St. Paul. Son of Charles Bruce and Margaret Constance (Suter) Koons.

Bachelor in Philosophy, Michigan State University, 1979. Master of Arts in Philosophy and Theology, Oxford University, England, 1981. Doctor of Philosophy in Philosophy, University of California at Los Angeles, 1987.

Koons was Assistant professor philosophy University Texas, Austin, 1987-1993, associate professor, 1993-2000, professor, since 2000.

Koons was faculty affiliate Christian Leadership Ministries, Dallas, 1987. Member American Philosophical Association, Association Symbolic Logic, Society Christian Philosophers. He was named Claude R. Lambe fellow, Institute Humane Studies, 1986; recipient Gustave O. Arlt prize in humanities Council Graduate Schools, 1992; Richard Weaver fellow Intercollegiate Studies Institute, 1985, Danforth fellow, Danforth Foundation, 1979, Marshall scholar, 1979.

Educational activities
Koons has been involved in debates over issues of academic freedom and has advocated for college exit exams as he believes the measures used currently don't measure how well students learn.  He  led an effort at UT to create a concentration in Western Civilization and American Institutions.    The goal of the program was to promote the study of the "Great Books" of the Western tradition, especially the American founding.  Koons stated that  the program transcended political differences.

Koons is a national Senator of the Phi Beta Kappa Society, as well as a member of the executive committee of the Society of Christian Philosophers.

Contemporary metaphysics
Koons is co-editor, with George Bealer, of The Waning of Materialism: New Essays in the Philosophy of Mind (Oxford University Press, 2010), a collection of articles by leading analytic philosophers critical of physicalism and materialism. He is engaged in contributing to contemporary metaphysics and the philosophy of religion, including Metaphysics: The Fundamentals (with co-author Timothy Pickavance; Wiley-Blackwell, 2015) and The Atlas of Reality: A Comprehensive Guide to Reality (with co-author Timothy Pickavance; Wiley-Blackwell, 2017).

Works
Paradoxes of Belief and Strategic Rationality (Cambridge University Press, 1992)
Realism Regained: An Exact Theory of Causation, Teleology, and the Mind (Oxford University Press, 2000)
The Waning of Materialism: New Essays (with George Bealer) (Oxford University Press, 2010)
Metaphysics: The Fundamentals (with Timothy Pickavance), (Wiley-Blackwell, 2015)
The Atlas of Reality: A Complete Guide to Metaphysics (with Timothy Pickavance), (Wiley-Blackwell, 2017)
’’Neo-Aristotelian Perspectives on Contemporary Science’’ (with William Simpson and Nicholas Teh), (Routledge, 2018)

References

External links
 Robert Koons' faculty page

Living people
Philosophy academics
American philosophers
Analytic philosophers
Catholic philosophers
Metaphysicians
Philosophers of mind
Philosophers of religion
Philosophers of education
Critics of atheism
1957 births